Hypatopa ira is a moth in the family Blastobasidae. It is found in Costa Rica.

The forewings are pale brown intermixed with brown scales. The hindwings are translucent pale brown.

Etymology
The specific name is derived from Latin ira (meaning wrath or anger).

References

Moths described in 2013
Hypatopa